The Amsterdam Music Festival (AMF) is an electronic dance music (EDM) event that takes place during the Amsterdam Dance Event mid-October in Amsterdam, Netherlands. Since the second edition in 2014, the main event has taken place in the Johan Cruijff Arena. In 2015 and 2016 the event was a multiple day EDM-event.

During the AMF, the DJ Mag Top 100 DJs is announced and several prizes are awarded, among which the award for the number one DJ in the world. The music that is played is mostly house and dance music; other genres that are also played at the event include techno, trance and hardstyle.

History
In 2013 ALDA Events and ID&T organised the first edition of AMF together, to celebrate the 25th anniversary of Dutch Dance. The first edition took place in RAI Amsterdam and had 25,000 visitors.

Due to the big interest the second edition of the event, in 2014, moved from RAI Amsterdam to the Amsterdam Arena. The event grows to 35,000 visitors.

In 2015 the event expands to a two-day event, of which the first evening was dominated by the DJ Mag Top 100 award show and the second evening - which was also being held in the ArenA - was filled with a various lineup. In addition, AMF starts their cooperation with Dance4Life, an NGO that works together with youngsters to build a world without AIDS. For every ticket sold, AMF donates 50 cents to the charity 

In 2016 organizers ALDA Events and ID&T decided to expand the event even further to eight events on five evenings, in three venues: Amsterdam ArenA, Heineken Music Hall and Ziggo Dome. With an official opening and closing ceremony, two shows in the Amsterdam ArenA and several hostings, the fourth edition of AMF was the biggest festival during the Amsterdam Dance Event with 45,000 visitors. According to market research office GfK Netherlands, AMF generated almost 28 million euros for the economy of Amsterdam.

In 2017 the first lustrum edition of AMF was celebrated, with a one-night only show. For the lustrum edition, they launched a new concept: 'II=I' (pronounced Two is One). During the event they let two DJs or DJ-acts play a special back to back set.

In June 2018 it was collectively decided that ALDA would organize AMF without ID&T, after years of a successful collaboration. According to the manager of ID&T, the reasons included that they wanted to focus on new projects of their own.

Information per edition

Music
In 2015 and 2016 an anthem was released for the event.

 2015: Roovel – Skylights
 2016: Jay Hardway – Amsterdam

References

External links
 

Music festivals in the Netherlands